Held by the Enemy is a lost 1920 American silent Civil War melodrama film directed by Donald Crisp and based on the 1886 play by William Gillette. The film starred Agnes Ayres, Lewis Stone, and Jack Holt. It was produced by Famous Players-Lasky and distributed by Paramount Pictures.

Plot
As described in a film magazine, Rachel Hayne (Ayres), whose husband, a Southern soldier, is believed to have died in battle, renews a former love affair with Union fighter Colonel Charles Prescott (Holt). She also cultivates the friendship of another Northerner, Brigade Surgeon Fielding (Cain), for the purpose of obtaining quinine from him to pass on to Southern soldiers. Prescott is about to avow his love when the husband Captain Gordon Haine (Stone) returns. When Hayne is recaptured as a spy, Fielding accuses Prescott of trumping up the charge to dispose of the husband. Hayne escapes from his imprisonment, but is then recaptured, and after several incidents commits suicide. This leaves the love road free for his former wife, who never loved him, and the man to whom she has given her heart.

Cast
Agnes Ayres as Rachel Hayne
Wanda Hawley as Emmy McCreery
Josephine Crowell as Sarah Hayne
Lillian Leighton as Clarissa
Lewis Stone as Captain Gordon Haine
Jack Holt as Colonel Charles Prescott
Robert Cain as Brigade Surgeon Fielding
Walter Hiers as Thomas Beene
Robert Brower as Uncle Rufus
Clarence Geldart as Major General Stanton
Byron Douglas

References

External links

Still at silenthollywood.com

1920 films
American silent feature films
Lost American films
Films directed by Donald Crisp
Paramount Pictures films
American films based on plays
American black-and-white films
Melodrama films
1920 drama films
American war drama films
1920 lost films
Lost war drama films
1920 war films
1920s war drama films
1920s American films
Silent American drama films
Silent war drama films